Devon League 2 (also known as Devon League 2 for sponsorship reasons) was an English level ten rugby union league for clubs based in Devon; with one exception (St Columba and Torpoint RFC is based in Torpoint, Cornwall and have always played in Plymouth Combination competitions). The champions and runners-up are promoted to Devon League 1, and since the cancellation of Devon League 3 in 2003 there was no relegation as this is the lowest division in club rugby union within Devon.

The league was cancelled at the end of the 2017-18 season, with teams being either promoted into Devon League 1 or transferred into the Devon Merit Leagues.

Format
The season runs from September to April and comprises twenty-six rounds of matches, with each club playing each of its rivals, home and away. The results of the matches contribute points to the league as follows:
 4 points are awarded for a win
 2 points are awarded for a draw
 0 points are awarded for a loss, however
 1 losing (bonus) point is awarded to a team that loses a match by 7 points or fewer
 1 additional (bonus) point is awarded to a team scoring 4 tries or more in a match.
The top two teams are promoted to Western Counties West and the bottom three teams are relegated to either Cornwall One or Devon One depending on their location.

2017–18
The season is due to start on 28 October 2017 and the last matches are due to be played on 24 February 2018

Participating clubs and locations

2016–17

Participating clubs

Final table

2015–16

Participating clubs and locations

2014–15
North Tawton came first and were promoted to Devon 1 along with the runner-up Tamar Saracens. Both teams won thirteen of their fourteen matches; losing just the one match away to each other.

2013–14

Participating clubs

Final table

2012–13

Participating clubs
 Buckfastleigh Ramblers
 Devonport HSOB
 Ilfracombe
 North Tawton
 Plymouth Argaum
 Plympton Victoria
 St Columba & Torpoint
 Tamar Saracens

Final table

Original teams
When league rugby began in 1987 this division was split into two regional leagues known as Devon 2A and Devon 2B and contained the following teams:

Devon 2A

Devon 2A was for teams based in Plymouth and the surrounding area.

Devonport HSOB
Jesters
Plympton
Plymouth YMCA
Old Public Oaks
Old Plymothian & Mannamedian
Tamar Saracens
St Columba & Torpoint
Victoria

Devon 2B

Devon 2B was for teams based in the rest of Devon.

Cullompton
Dartmouth
North Tawton
Salcombe
Tavistock
Topsham
Withycombe

Devon League 2 honours

Devon League 2A / 2B (1987–1992)

The original Devon 2 (sponsored by Courage) was split into two tier 10 regional leagues - Devon 2A (Plymouth region) and Devon 2B (rest of Devon).  Promotion was up to Devon 1 and there was no relegation.

Devon League 2 (1992–1993)

Ahead of the 1992–93 season Devon 2A and 2B were merged into a single tier 10 division known as Devon 2.  Promotion continued to Devon 1 and there was no relegation.  The league continued to be sponsored by Courage.

Devon League 2 (1993–96)

The creation of National 5 South for the 1993–94 season meant that Devon 2 dropped to become a tier 11 league.  Promotion continued to Devon 1 and there was no relegation until the introduction of Devon 3 at the end of the 1995–96 season.  The league continued to be sponsored by Courage.

Devon League 2 (1996–2003)

The cancellation of National 5 South at the end of the 1995–96 season saw Devon 2 return to being a tier 10 division.  Promotion continued to Cornwall/Devon and relegation was now down to the new Devon 3.

Devon League 2 (2003–2009)

Devon 2 continued as a tier 10 league with promotion to Devon 1.  However, the cancellation of Devon 3 at the end of the 2002–03 meant that there was no longer relegation.  From the 2008–09 season onward the league sponsor would be Tribute.

Devon 1 South & West (2009–2010)

For a solitary season Devon 2 was known as Devon 1 South & West.  It remained a tier 10 league with promotion to Devon 1 and there was no relegation.  Tribute would continue to sponsor the league.

Devon League 2 (2010–2018)

Devon 1 South & West was renamed back to Devon 2 for the 2010–11 season onward.  It continued as a tier 10 league with promotion to Devon 1 and there was no relegation.  Tribute would continue to sponsor the league.  At the end of the 2017–18 season Devon 2 was disbanded and all teams transferred into either Devon 1 or the Devon Merit Leagues.

Number of league titles

Ilfracombe (3)
Salcombe (3)
Totnes (3)
Cullompton (2)
Devonport HSOB (2)
North Tawton (2)
Prince Rock Woodland Fort (2) 
Tamar Saracens (2)
Topsham (2)
Buckfastleigh Ramblers (1)
Dartmouth (1)
Exeter Saracens (1)
Exeter University (1)
Honiton (1)
Jesters (1)
New Cross (1)
Old Plymothian & Mannamedian (1)
Old Public Oaks (1)
Old Technicians (1)
Plymouth Argaum (1)
Plymstock Albion Oaks (1)
St Columba & Torpoint (1)
Tavistock (1)
Withycombe (1)

Notes

See also
 South West Division RFU
 Devon RFU
 Devon 1
 Devon 3
 English rugby union system
 Rugby union in England

References

External links
 Devon RFU

D
Recurring sporting events established in 1987
Sports leagues established in 1987
Rugby union in Devon